The Book of Job, or simply Job, is a book found in the Ketuvim ("Writings") section of the Hebrew Bible (Tanakh), and is the first of the Poetic Books in the Old Testament of the Christian Bible. Scholars are generally agreed that it was written between the 7th and 4th centuries BCE. It addresses theodicy, why God permits evil in the world, through the experiences of the eponymous protagonist. Job is a wealthy and God-fearing man with a comfortable life and a large family; God, having asked Satan for his opinion of Job's piety, decides to take away Job's wealth, family and material comforts, following Satan's accusation that if Job were rendered penniless and without his family, he would turn away from God.

Structure

The Book of Job consists of a prose prologue and epilogue narrative framing poetic dialogues and monologues. It is common to view the narrative frame as the original core of the book, enlarged later by the poetic dialogues and discourses, and sections of the book such as the Elihu speeches and the wisdom poem of chapter 28 as late insertions, but recent trends have tended to concentrate on the book's underlying editorial unity.

 : in two scenes, the first on Earth, the second in Heaven
 : seen by some scholars as a bridge between the prologue and the dialogues and by others as the beginning of the dialogues and three cycles of dialogues between Job and his three friends – the third cycle is not complete, the expected speech of Zophar being replaced by the wisdom poem of chapter 28
 Three monologues:
 , with Job's responses
  – Job's restoration

Contents

Prologue on Earth and in Heaven
In chapter 1, the prologue on Earth introduces Job as a righteous man, blessed with wealth, sons, and daughters, who lives in the land of Uz. The scene then shifts to Heaven, where God asks Satan for his opinion of Job's piety. Satan accuses Job of being pious only because God has materially blessed him; if God were to take away everything that Job has, then he would surely curse God.

God gives Satan permission to take Job's wealth and kill his children and servants, but Job nonetheless praises God: "Naked I came from my mother's womb, and naked shall I return there; the Lord gave, and the Lord has taken away; blessed be the name of the Lord." In chapter 2, God further allows Satan to afflict Job's body with boils. Job sits in ashes, and his wife prompts him to "curse God, and die", but Job answers: "Shall we receive good from God and shall we not receive evil?"

Job's opening monologue and dialogues between Job and his three friends 
In chapter 3, "instead of cursing God", Job laments the night of his conception and the day of his birth; he longs for death, "but it does not come". His three friends, Eliphaz the Temanite, Bildad the Shuhite and Zophar the Naamathite, visit him, accuse him of committing sin and tell him that his suffering was deserved as a result. Job responds with scorn: his interlocutors are "miserable comforters". Since a just God would not treat him so harshly, patience in suffering is impossible, and the Creator should not take his creatures so lightly, to come against them with such force.

Job's responses represent one of the most radical restatements of Israelite theology in the Hebrew Bible. He moves away from the pious attitude shown in the prologue, and begins to berate God for the disproportionate wrath against him. He sees God as, among others, intrusive and suffocating; unforgiving and obsessed with destroying a human target; angry; fixated on punishment; and hostile and destructive. He then shifts his focus from the injustice that he himself suffers to God's governance of the world. He suggests that the wicked have taken advantage of the needy and the helpless, who remain in significant hardship, but God does nothing to punish them.

Three monologues: Poem to Wisdom, Job's closing monologue, and Elihu's speeches 

The dialogues of Job and his friends are followed by a poem (the "hymn to wisdom") on the inaccessibility of wisdom: "Where is wisdom to be found?" it asks, and concludes that it has been hidden from man (chapter 28). Job contrasts his previous fortune with his present plight, an outcast, mocked and in pain. He protests his innocence, lists the principles he has lived by, and demands that God answer him.

Elihu (a character not previously mentioned) occupies chapters 32 to 37, intervening to state that wisdom comes from God, who reveals it through dreams and visions to those who will then declare their knowledge.

Two speeches by God
From chapter 38, God speaks from a whirlwind. God's speeches neither explain Job's suffering, nor defend divine justice, nor enter into the courtroom confrontation that Job has demanded, nor respond to his oath of innocence. Instead God contrasts Job's weakness with divine wisdom and omnipotence: "Where were you when I laid the foundations of the earth?" Job makes a brief response, but God's monologue resumes, never addressing Job directly.

In Job 42:1–6, Job makes his final response, confessing God's power and his own lack of knowledge "of things beyond me which I did not know". Previously he has only heard, but now his eyes have seen God, and therefore, he declares, "I retract and repent in dust and ashes".

Epilogue
God tells Eliphaz that he and the two other friends "have not spoken of me what is right as my servant Job has done". The three (Elihu, the critic of Job and his friends, is not mentioned here) are told to make a burnt offering with Job as their intercessor, "for only to him will I show favour". Job is restored to health, riches and family, and lives to see his children to the fourth generation.

Composition

Authorship, language, texts
The character Job appears in the 6th-century BCE Book of Ezekiel as an exemplary righteous man of antiquity, and the author of the Book of Job has apparently chosen this legendary hero for his parable. Scholars generally agree that it was written between the 7th and 4th centuries BCE, with the 6th century BCE as the most likely period for various reasons. The anonymous author was almost certainly an Israelite, although the story is set outside Israel, in southern Edom or northern Arabia, and makes allusion to places as far apart as Mesopotamia and Egypt.

Religious views on authorship can vary, but historically Moses has been seen as having written the Book of Job.  This view is given in the Jewish Talmud, and was also held by the medieval Jewish philosopher Saadia Gaon.  Modern Christians have sometimes agreed with the Jewish tradition, while other Christian believers have speculated that Elihu, Solomon, Ezra, or even Job himself may have written the book.

The language of Job stands out for its conservative spelling and for its exceptionally large number of words and forms not found elsewhere in the Bible. Many later scholars down to the 20th century looked for an Aramaic, Arabic or Edomite original, but a close analysis suggests that the foreign words and foreign-looking forms are literary affectations designed to lend authenticity to the book's distant setting and give it a foreign flavor.

Job exists in a number of forms: the Hebrew Masoretic Text, which underlies many modern Bible translations; the Greek Septuagint made in Egypt in the last centuries BCE; and Aramaic and Hebrew manuscripts found among the Dead Sea Scrolls.

In the Latin Vulgate, the New Revised Standard Version and in Protestant Bibles, it is placed after the Book of Esther as the first of the poetic books. In the Hebrew Bible it is located within the Ketuvim. John Hartley notes that in Sephardic manuscripts the texts are ordered as Psalms, Job, Proverbs but in Ashkenazic texts the order is Psalms, Proverbs, and then Job. In the Catholic Jerusalem Bible it is described as the first of the "wisdom books" and follows the two books of the Maccabees.

Job and the wisdom tradition
Job, Ecclesiastes and the Book of Proverbs belong to the genre of wisdom literature, sharing a perspective that they themselves call the "way of wisdom". Wisdom means both a way of thinking and a body of knowledge gained through such thinking, as well as the ability to apply it to life. In its Biblical application in wisdom literature, it is seen as attainable in part through human effort and in part as a gift from God, but never in its entirety – except by God.

The three books of wisdom literature share attitudes and assumptions but differ in their conclusions: Proverbs makes confident statements about the world and its workings that are flatly contradicted by Job and Ecclesiastes. Wisdom literature from Sumeria and Babylonia can be dated to the third millennium BCE. Several texts from ancient Mesopotamia and Egypt offer parallels to Job, and while it is impossible to tell whether the author of Job was influenced by any of them, their existence suggests that the author was the recipient of a long tradition of reflection on the existence of inexplicable suffering.

Themes

The Book of Job is an investigation of the problem of divine justice. This problem, known in theology as the problem of evil or theodicy, can be rephrased as a question: "Why do the righteous suffer?" The conventional answer in ancient Israel was that God rewards virtue and punishes sin (the principle known as "retributive justice"). This assumes a world in which human choices and actions are morally significant, but experience demonstrates that suffering is frequently unmerited.

The biblical concept of righteousness was rooted in the covenant-making God who had ordered creation for communal well-being, and the righteous were those who invested in the community, showing special concern for the poor and needy (see Job's description of his life in chapter 31). Their antithesis were the wicked, who were selfish and greedy. The Satan (or the Adversary) raises the question of whether there is such a thing as disinterested righteousness: if God rewards righteousness with prosperity, will men not act righteously from selfish motives? He asks God to test this by removing the prosperity of Job, the most righteous of all God's servants.

The book begins with the frame narrative, giving the reader an omniscient "God's eye perspective" which introduces Job as a man of exemplary faith and piety, "blameless and upright", who "fears God" and "shuns evil". The contrast between the frame and the poetic dialogues and monologues, in which Job never learns of the opening scenes in heaven or of the reason for his suffering, creates a sense of dramatic irony between the divine view of the Adversary's wager, and the human view of Job's suffering "without any reason" (2:3).

In the poetic dialogues Job's friends see his suffering and assume he must be guilty, since God is just. Job, knowing he is innocent, concludes that God must be unjust. He retains his piety throughout the story (contradicting the Adversary's suspicion that his righteousness is due to the expectation of reward), but makes clear from his first speech that he agrees with his friends that God should and does reward righteousness. Elihu rejects the arguments of both parties: Job is wrong to accuse God of injustice, as God is greater than human beings, and nor are the friends correct; for suffering, far from being a punishment, may "rescue the afflicted from their affliction" and make them more amenable to revelation – literally, "open their ears" (Job 36:15).

Chapter 28, the Poem (or Hymn) to Wisdom, introduces another theme, divine wisdom. The hymn does not place any emphasis on retributive justice, stressing instead the inaccessibility of wisdom. Wisdom cannot be invented or purchased, it says; God alone knows the meaning of the world, and he grants it only to those who live in reverence before him. God possesses wisdom because he grasps the complexities of the world (Job 28:24–26) – a theme which looks forward to God's speech in chapters 38–41 with its repeated refrain "Where were you when...?"

When God finally speaks he neither explains the reason for Job's suffering (revealed to the reader in the prologue in heaven) nor defends his justice. The first speech focuses on his role in maintaining order in the universe: the list of things that God does and Job cannot do demonstrates divine wisdom because order is the heart of wisdom. Job then confesses his lack of wisdom, meaning his lack of understanding of the workings of the cosmos and of the ability to maintain it. The second speech concerns God's role in controlling behemoth and leviathan, sometimes translated as the hippopotamus and crocodile, but more probably representing primeval cosmic creatures, in either case demonstrating God's wisdom and power.

Job's reply to God's final speech is longer than his first and more complicated. The usual view is that he admits to being wrong to challenge God and now repents "in dust and ashes" (Job 42:6), but the Hebrew is difficult, and an alternative understanding is that Job says he was wrong to repent and mourn and does not retract any of his arguments. In the concluding part of the frame narrative God restores and increases his prosperity, indicating that the divine policy on retributive justice remains unchanged.

Influence and interpretation

History of interpretation

In the Second Temple period (500 BCE–70 CE), the character of Job began to be transformed into something more patient and steadfast, with his suffering a test of virtue and a vindication of righteousness for the glory of God. The process of "sanctifying" Job began with the Greek Septuagint translation and was furthered in the apocryphal Testament of Job (1st century BCE–1st century CE), which makes him the hero of patience. This reading pays little attention to the Job of the dialogue sections of the book, but it was the tradition taken up by the Epistle of James in the New Testament, which presents Job as one whose patience and endurance should be emulated by believers (James 5:7–11).

When Christians began interpreting Job 19:23–29 (verses concerning a "redeemer" who Job hopes can save him from God) as a prophecy of Christ, the predominant Jewish view became "Job the blasphemer", with some rabbis even saying that he was rightly punished by God because he had stood by while Pharaoh massacred the innocent Jewish infants.

Augustine of Hippo recorded that Job had prophesied the coming of Christ, and Pope Gregory I offered him as a model of right living worthy of respect. The medieval Jewish scholar Maimonides declared his story a parable, and the medieval Christian Thomas Aquinas wrote a detailed commentary declaring it true history. In the Protestant Reformation, Martin Luther explained how Job's confession of sinfulness and worthlessness underlay his saintliness, and John Calvin's interpretation of Job demonstrated the doctrine of the resurrection and the ultimate certainty of divine justice.

The contemporary movement known as creation theology, an ecological theology valuing the needs of all creation, interprets God's speeches in Job 38–41 to imply that his interests and actions are not exclusively focused on humankind.

Liturgical use
Jewish liturgy does not use readings from the Book of Job in the manner of the Pentateuch, Prophets, or Five Megillot, although it is quoted at funerals and times of mourning. However, there are some Jews, particularly the Spanish and Portuguese Jews, who do hold public readings of Job on the Tisha B'Av fast (a day of mourning over the destruction of the First and Second Temples and other tragedies). The cantillation signs for the large poetic section in the middle of the Book of Job differ from those of most of the biblical books, using a system shared with it only by Psalms and Proverbs.

The Eastern Orthodox Church reads from Job and Exodus during Holy Week. Exodus prepares for the understanding of Christ's exodus to his Father, of his fulfillment of the whole history of salvation; Job, the sufferer, is the Old Testament icon of Christ.

The Roman Catholic Church reads from Job during Matins in the first two weeks of September and in the Office of the Dead, and in the revised Liturgy of the Hours Job is read during the Fifth, Twelfth, and Twenty Sixth Week in Ordinary Time.

In the Post-Vatican II Lectionary for the Latin Rite, the Book of Job is read during:
 5th and 12th Sunday in Ordinary Time - Year B
 Weekday Reading for the 26th Week in Ordinary Time - Year II Cycle
 Ritual Masses for the Anointing of the Sick and Viaticum - First Reading options
 Masses for the Dead - First Reading options

In music, art, literature, and film

The Book of Job has been deeply influential in Western culture, to such an extent that no list could be more than representative.

Modern works based on the book include Ralph Vaughan Williams's Job: A Masque for Dancing; French composer Darius Milhaud's Cantata From Job; and Joseph Stein's Broadway interpretation Fiddler on the Roof, based on the Tevye the Dairyman stories by Sholem Aleichem. Neil Simon wrote God's Favorite, which is a modern retelling of the Book of Job. Breughel and Georges de La Tour depicted Job visited by his wife, William Blake produced an entire cycle of illustrations for the book.

Writers Job has inspired or influenced include: John Milton (Samson Agonistes); Dostoevsky (The Brothers Karamazov); Alfred Döblin (Berlin Alexanderplatz); Franz Kafka (The Trial); Carl Jung (Answer to Job); Joseph Roth (Job); Bernard Malamud; and Elizabeth Brewster, whose book Footnotes to the Book of Job was a finalist for the 1996 Governor General's Award for poetry in Canada. Archibald MacLeish's drama JB, one of the most prominent uses of the Book of Job in modern literature, was awarded the Pulitzer Prize in 1959. Verses from the Book of Job  figured prominently in the plot of the film Mission: Impossible (1996). Job's influence can also be seen in the Coen brothers' 2009 film, A Serious Man, which was nominated for two Academy Awards.

Terrence Malick's 2011 film The Tree of Life, which won the Palme d'Or, is heavily influenced by the themes of the Book of Job, as the film starts with a quote from the beginning of God's speech to Job. The 2014 Indian Malayalam-language film Iyobinte Pusthakam by Amal Neerad tells the story of a man who is losing everything in his life. "The Sire of Sorrow (Job's Sad Song)" is the final track on Joni Mitchell's 15th studio album, Turbulent Indigo.

The Russian film Leviathan also draws themes from the Book of Job. In 2015 two Ukrainian composers Roman Grygoriv and Illia Razumeiko created the opera-requiem IYOV. The premiere of the opera was held on 21 September 2015 on the main stage of the international multidisciplinary festival Gogolfest.

In the 3rd episode of the 15th season of ER, the lines of Job 3:23 are quoted by doctor Abby Lockhart shortly before she and her husband (Dr. Luka Covac) leave the series forever.

In Islam and Arab folk tradition

Job is one of the 25 prophets mentioned by name in the Quran, where he is lauded as a steadfast and upright worshipper (Q.38:44). His story has the same basic outline as in the Bible, although the three friends are replaced by his brothers, and his wife stays by his side.

In Palestinian folklore, Job's place of trial is Al-Joura, a village outside the town of Al Majdal (Ashkelon). It was there that God rewarded him with a Fountain of Youth that removed whatever illnesses he had and restored his youth. Al-Joura was a place of annual festivities (four days in all) when people of many faiths gathered and bathed in a natural spring. In Lebanon the Muwahideen (or Druze) community have a shrine built in the Shouf area that allegedly contains Job's tomb. There is also a tomb of Job outside the city of Salalah in Oman.

See also
 Answer to Job by Carl Jung
 Book of Job in Byzantine illuminated manuscripts
 Moralia in Job
 , the "Babylonian Job"
 Testament of Job

Notes

References

Citations

Sources 

 
 
 
 
 
 
 
 
 
 
 
 
 
 

 
 
 
 
 
 
 . Docx extract.

Further reading 
 Michael Wise, Martin Abegg, Jr, and Edward Cook (1996), The Dead Sea Scrolls: A New Translation, Harper San Francisco paperback 1999,  (contains the non-biblical portion of the scrolls)
 Stella Papadaki-Oekland, Byzantine Illuminated Manuscripts of the Book of Job,

External links 

 Sephardic Cantillations for the Book of Job by David M. Betesh and the Sephardic Pizmonim Project
 Translations of The Book of Job at BibleGateway.com
 Hebrew and English Parallel and Complete Text of the Book of Job English Translation is the 1917 Old JPS
 
 

 
6th-century BC books
Job (biblical figure)
Ketuvim
Poetic Books
Satan
Texts attributed to Moses
Tisha B'Av